Kartah was a Levitical city in the territory of the tribe of Zebulun assigned, according to the Hebrew Bible, to the Levites of the family of Merari. It is identical with Kattath, and perhaps also with Kitron.

See also
Khirbat Qumbaza

Levitical cities